XY gonadal dysgenesis, also known as Swyer syndrome, is a type of hypogonadism in a person whose karyotype is 46,XY. Though they typically have normal female external genitalia, the person has functionless gonads, fibrous tissue termed "streak gonads", and if left untreated, will not experience puberty. Such gonads are typically surgically removed (as they have a significant risk of developing cancer). The typical medical treatment is hormone replacement therapy.
The syndrome was named after Gerald Swyer, an endocrinologist based in London.

Signs and symptoms
Humans with Swyer syndrome develop with external phenotypes typical of females and nonfunctional gonads instead of ovaries or testes. Individuals are most commonly diagnosed during puberty after menstruation fails to occur (primary amenorrhea).

The consequences of Swyer syndrome without treatment:
 Gonads do not have two X chromosomes, so the breasts will not develop and the uterus will not grow and menstruate until estrogen is administered. This is often given transdermally.
 Gonads cannot make progesterone, so menstrual periods will not be predictable until progestin is administered, usually as a pill.
 Gonads cannot produce eggs, so conceiving children is not possible without embryo transfer. There has been a case of unassisted pregnancy in one woman with XY gonadal dysgenesis, who had a predominantly 46,XY karyotype – a 46,XY karyotype in peripheral lymphocytes, mosaicism in cultured skin fibroblasts (80% 46,XY and 20% 45,X), and a predominantly 46,XY karyotype in the ovary (93% 46,XY and 6% 45,X) –  who gave birth to a 46,XY female with complete gonadal dysgenesis.
 Streak gonads with Y chromosome-containing cells have a high likelihood of developing cancer, especially gonadoblastoma. Streak gonads are usually removed within a year or so of diagnosis, since the cancer can begin during infancy.
 Osteopenia is often present.

Genetics

Genetic associations of Swyer syndrome include:

Seven other genes have been identified with probable associations that are as-yet less clearly understood.

Pure gonadal dysgenesis
There are several forms of gonadal dysgenesis. The term "pure gonadal dysgenesis" (PGD) has been used to describe conditions with normal sets of sex chromosomes (e.g., 46,XX or 46,XY), as opposed to those whose gonadal dysgenesis results from missing all or part of the second sex chromosome. The latter group includes those with Turner syndrome (i.e., 45,X) and its variants, as well as those with mixed gonadal dysgenesis and a mixture of cell lines, some containing a Y chromosome (e.g., 46,XY/45,X).

Thus Swyer syndrome is referred to as PGD, 46,XY, and XX gonadal dysgenesis as PGD, 46,XX. People with PGD have a normal karyotype but may have defects of a specific gene on a chromosome.

Pathogenesis
The first known step of sexual differentiation of a normal XY fetus is the development of testes. The early stages of testicular formation in the second month of gestation requires the action of several genes, one of the earliest and most important of which is SRY: the sex-determining region of the Y chromosome.

When such a gene is defective, the indifferent gonads fail to differentiate into testes in an XY fetus. Without testes, no testosterone or antimüllerian hormone (AMH) is produced. Without testosterone, the wolffian ducts fail to develop, so no internal male organs are formed. Also, the lack of testosterone means that no dihydrotestosterone is formed and consequently the external genitalia fail to virilize, resulting in normal female genitalia.  Without AMH, the Müllerian ducts develop into normal internal female organs (uterus, fallopian tubes, cervix, vagina).

Diagnosis
Due to the inability of the streak gonads to produce sex hormones (both estrogens and androgens), most of the secondary sex characteristics do not develop. This is especially true of estrogenic changes such as breast development, widening of the pelvis and hips, and menstrual periods. As the adrenal glands can make limited amounts of androgens and are not affected by this syndrome, most of these persons will develop pubic hair, though it often remains sparse.

Evaluation of delayed puberty usually reveals elevation of gonadotropins, indicating that the pituitary is providing the signal for puberty but the gonads are failing to respond. The next steps of the evaluation usually include checking a karyotype and imaging of the pelvis. The karyotype reveals XY chromosomes and the imaging demonstrates the presence of a uterus but no ovaries (the streak gonads are not usually seen by most imaging). Although an XY karyotype can also indicate a person with complete androgen insensitivity syndrome, the absence of breasts, and the presence of a uterus and pubic hair exclude the possibility. At this point it is usually possible for a physician to make a diagnosis of Swyer syndrome.

Related conditions
Swyer syndrome represents one phenotypic result of a failure of the gonads to develop properly, and hence is part of a class of conditions termed gonadal dysgenesis. There are many forms of gonadal dysgenesis.

Swyer syndrome is an example of a condition in which an externally unambiguous female body carries dysgenetic, atypical, or abnormal gonads. Other examples include complete androgen insensitivity syndrome, partial X chromosome deletions, lipoid congenital adrenal hyperplasia, and Turner syndrome.

Treatment
Upon diagnosis, estrogen and progestogen therapy is typically commenced, promoting the development of female characteristics.

Hormone replacement therapy can also reduce the likelihood of osteoporosis.

Epidemiology
A 2017 study estimated that the incidence of Swyer syndrome is approximately 1 in 100,000 females. Fewer than 100 cases have been reported as of 2018. There are extremely rare instances of familial Swyer syndrome.

History
Swyer syndrome was first described by G. I. M. Swyer in 1955 in a report of two cases.

People with XY gonadal dysgenesis 

 Arisleyda Dilone, director and actress
 Stanisława Walasiewicz (also known as Stella Walsh), Polish-American Olympic athlete whose genetic condition was confirmed after her death

See also

XX male syndrome

References

Further reading

External links

Syndromes
Gynaecologic disorders
Congenital disorders of genital organs
Intersex variations